Derwent United Football Club is an Australian association football club based in Bridgewater, Tasmania.

References

External links
 Club Facebook Page

Soccer clubs in Tasmania
Association football clubs established in 2011
2011 establishments in Australia